A tree-walking automaton (TWA) is a type of finite automaton that deals with tree structures rather than strings. The concept was originally proposed by Aho and Ullman.

The following article deals with tree-walking automata. For a different notion of tree automaton, closely related to regular tree languages, see branching automaton.

Definition

All trees are assumed to be binary, with labels from a fixed alphabet Σ.

Informally, a tree-walking automaton (TWA) A is a finite state device that walks over an input tree in a sequential manner. At each moment A visits a node v in state q. Depending on the state q, the label of the node v, and whether the node is the root, a left child, a right child or a leaf, A changes its state from q to q''' and moves to the parent of v or its left or right child. A TWA accepts a tree if it enters an accepting state, and rejects if its enters a rejecting state or makes an infinite loop. As with string automata, a TWA may be deterministic or nondeterministic.

More formally, a (nondeterministic) tree-walking automaton over an alphabet Σ is a tuple

Example

A simple example of a tree-walking automaton is a TWA that performs depth-first search (DFS) on the input tree. The automaton  has three states, .  begins in the root in state  and descends to the left subtree. Then it processes the tree recursively.

Properties

Unlike branching automata, tree-walking automata are difficult to analyze: even simple properties are nontrivial to prove. The following list summarizes some known facts related to TWA:
As shown by Bojańczyk and Colcombet, deterministic TWA are strictly weaker than nondeterministic ones
deterministic TWA are closed under complementation (but it is not known whether the same holds for nondeterministic ones)
the set of languages recognized by TWA is strictly contained in regular tree languages, i.e. there exist regular languages that are not recognized by any tree-walking automaton, see Bojańczyk and Colcombet.

See also

Pebble automata, an extension of tree-walking automata

References

External links
Mikołaj Bojańczyk: Tree-walking automata. A brief survey.

Trees (data structures)
Automata (computation)